The rufous-tailed antthrush or Brazilian antthrush (Chamaeza ruficauda) is a species of bird in the family Formicariidae. It is endemic to the Atlantic Forest in southeastern Brazil and far northeastern Argentina (only Misiones Province). The cryptic antthrush and short-tailed antthrush are present in the same region, but these are mainly found at lower altitudes than the rufous-tailed antthrush.

References

 Willis, E. O. (1992). Three Chamaeza Antthrushes in eastern Brazil (Formicariidae). Condor 94:110-116

rufous-tailed antthrush
Birds of the Atlantic Forest
rufous-tailed antthrush
Taxonomy articles created by Polbot